PS Duke of Sutherland was a paddle steamer cargo vessel operated by the London and North Western Railway from 1868 to 1886.

Description
She was powered by a 2-cylinder oscillating steam engine which had cylinders of  diameter by  stroke. Built by R. Stephenson & Co., Newcastle upon Tyne, Northumberland, the engine was rated at 270 nhp. Accommodation was provided for 90 passengers.

History

Duke of Sutherland was built as yard number 96 by A. Leslie and Company, Hebburn on Tyne, Northumberland for the London and North Western Railway. She was launched on 26 March 1868 and completed in May. The United Kingdom Official Number 58402 was allocated and her port of registry was London. All on board were rescued. She was on a voyage from Dublin to Holyhead. She was withdrawn from service in 1888 and sold for breaking.

References

1868 ships
Steamships
Ships built on the River Tyne
Ships of the London and North Western Railway
Paddle steamers of the United Kingdom
Maritime incidents in February 1877